Events from the year 1807 in France.

Incumbents
 Emperor – Napoleon I

Events
7 January - The United Kingdom issues an Order in Council prohibiting British ships from trading with France or its allies.
7–8 February - Battle of Eylau, indecisive result, but Russian retreat.
19 March - Siege of Danzig begins as French lay siege to Prussian and Russian forces.
4 May - Treaty of Finckenstein signed between France and Qajar dynasty Persia, guaranteeing the latter's integrity.
24 May - Siege of Danzig ends with Prussian and Russian capitulation.
10 June - Battle of Heilsberg, inconclusive.
14 June - Battle of Friedland: decisive French victory over Russian forces.
7–9 July - Treaties of Tilsit end the war with Russia and Prussia.
20 July - Nicéphore Niépce is awarded a patent by Napoleon for the Pyréolophore, the world's first internal combustion engine, after it successfully powers a boat upstream on the river Saône.
27 October - Treaty of Fontainebleau signed between Spain and France, dividing Portugal and all its dominions between the signatories.
9 September - Napoleon establishes the Free City of Danzig.
27 September - Napoleon purchases the Borghese art collection, including the Antinous Mondragone, and brings it to Paris.
24 November - Battle of Abrantes, Portugal: The French under Jean-Andoche Junot take the town.
17 December - Milan Decree issued by Napoleon, stating that no European country is to trade with the United Kingdom (the 'Continental System').

Births

January to June
6 January - Auguste Nicolas, Roman Catholic apologetical writer (died 1888)
29 January - Édouard Dulaurier, Orientalist and Egyptologist (died 1881)
2 February - Alexandre Auguste Ledru-Rollin, politician (died 1874)
5 February - Ernest Legouvé, dramatist (died 1903)
26 February - Théophile-Jules Pelouze, chemist (died 1867)
4 March - Jean Baptiste Lucien Buquet, entomologist (died 1889)
12 April - Charles Rigault de Genouilly, Admiral (died 1873)
26 April - Charles Auguste Frossard, general (died 1875)
17 May - Jules Guyot, physician and agronomist (died 1872)
17 June - Auguste Nélaton, physician and surgeon (died 1873)

July to December
24 August
Jean-Jacques Feuchère, sculptor (died 1852)
Jules Verreaux, botanist and ornithologist (died 1873)
3 September - Raymond Gayrard, sculptor (died 1855)
21 October - Napoléon Henri Reber, composer (died 1880)
14 November - Auguste Laurent, chemist (died 1853)
20 November - Augustus Thébaud, Jesuit educator and publicist (died 1885)
29 November - Jean Philippe Goujon de Grondel, General (born 1714)

Full date unknown
Auguste-Barthélemy Glaize, painter (died 1893)
Alphonse Sagebien, hydrological engineer (died 1892)

Deaths

January to June
13 January - Pierre Joseph Buchoz, physician, lawyer and naturalist (born 1731)
17 January - Pierre Marie Auguste Broussonet, naturalist (born 1761)
14 February - Jean-Joseph Ange d'Hautpoul, General (born 1754)
25 February - Jeanne-Marie Marsan, singer and actress (born 1746)
4 April - Jérôme Lalande, astronomer and writer (born 1732)
5 May - Napoleon Charles Bonaparte, eldest son of Louis Bonaparte (born 1802)
10 May - Jean-Baptiste Donatien de Vimeur, comte de Rochambeau, aristocrat and Marshal of France (born 1725)
18 May - Antoine Philippe, Duke of Montpensier, younger brother of Louis-Philippe of France (born 1775)

July to December
5 August - Jeanne Baret, first woman to circumnavigate the globe (born 1740)
19 August - Louis Binot, General (born 1771)
25 August
Sophie Ristaud Cottin, writer (born 1770)
Jean-Étienne-Marie Portalis, jurist and politician (born 1746)
31 August - Ponce Denis Écouchard Lebrun, poet (born 1729)
October - Louis Pierre de Chastenet de Puységur, soldier and Minister of War (born 1727)
2 November - Baron de Breteuil, aristocrat, diplomat and Prime Minister (born 1730)
8 November - Pierre-Alexandre-Laurent Forfait, engineer, hydrographer and Minister of the Navy (born 1752)
23 November - Jean-François Rewbell, lawyer, diplomat and politician (born 1747)

See also

References

1800s in France